Eric Boulter (born 15 October 1952) is an Australian swimmer, athlete, and wheelchair basketball player who won two medals at the 1972 Heidelberg Paralympics.

Personal

Boulter was born in Melbourne on 15 October 1952. While on a cycling holiday on the Gold Coast in 1969, he had a fall at the Nerang Velodrome which left him paraplegic. Outside of sport, Boulter worked for a speedboat charter business until 1984 before serving his local city council for 22 years. He moved to Rockhampton in 2012.

Competitive career
Boulter temporarily checked out of hospital to represent Queensland in his first National Disabled Championships in 1970. He then returned to the Gold Coast and searched for a coach. He found Dave Tomlinson, who worked with him for the rest of his career. He was the captain of the Australian swimming team at the 1972 Heidelberg Paralympics, where he won a gold medal in the Men's 25 m Backstroke 2 event, in which he broke a world record, and a silver medal in the Men's 3x25 m Medley 2 event; he also came fifth in the Men's 25 m Freestyle 2 – event. He was also the captain of the Australian swimming team at the 1974 Commonwealth Paraplegic Games in Dunedin, New Zealand, where he won two gold medals in the Men's 25 m Backstroke and Men's 4x50 m Medley Relay events, and two silver medals in the Men's 25 m Freestyle and Men's 3x25 m Individual Medley events; he broke a Commonwealth record in the backstroke. At the 1977 FESPIC Games in Sydney, he won a gold medal in the Men's 25 m Backstroke event and two silver medals in the Men's 25 m Freestyle and Men's Pentathlon events. He also played wheelchair basketball, representing Queensland in national championships from 1976 until his retirement from sport in 1984.

Recognition
Boulter was inducted into the Gold Coast Sporting Hall of Fame in 1999.

References

Australian men's wheelchair basketball players
Male Paralympic swimmers of Australia
Swimmers at the 1972 Summer Paralympics
Medalists at the 1972 Summer Paralympics
Paralympic gold medalists for Australia
Paralympic silver medalists for Australia
Paralympic medalists in swimming
Wheelchair category Paralympic competitors
People with paraplegia
Australian male freestyle swimmers
Australian male backstroke swimmers
Swimmers from Melbourne
1952 births
Living people